Wangenheim  is a municipality in the district of Gotha, in Thuringia, Germany.

Wangenheim may also refer to:

People
 Baroness Elisabeth of Wangenheim-Winterstein (1912–2010), the wife of Charles Augustus, Hereditary Grand Duke of Saxe-Weimar-Eisenach
 Chris von Wangenheim (1942–1981), German fashion photographer
 Christoph August von Wangenheim (1741–1830),  German Hanoverian army officer and court official
 Friedrich Adam Julius von Wangenheim (1749-1800), German botanist specializing in forestry
 Hans Freiherr von Wangenheim (1859–1915), German diplomat
 Gustav von Wangenheim (1895–1975), German actor, screenwriter and director
 Inge von Wangenheim (1912–1993), German actress
 Konrad Freiherr von Wangenheim (1909–1953), German army Cavalry Captain
 Volker Wangenheim (1928–2014), German conductor, composer and academic teacher

Other uses
 Wangenheimia, a genus of Mediterranean plants in the grass family